Senator Sewall may refer to:

Charles S. Sewall (1779–1848), Maryland State Senate
Harold M. Sewall (1860–1924), Maine State Senate
Joseph Sewall (1921–2011), Maine State Senate
Sumner Sewall (1897–1965), Maine State Senate

See also
William Joyce Sewell (1835–1901), U.S. Senator from New Jersey from 1881 to 1887 and from 1895 to 1901.